This is a list of all captains of the Brisbane Lions, an Australian rules football club with teams in the Australian Football League and AFL Women's.

AFL

AFL Women's

See also

References

External links
Brisbane Lions Honour Roll

captains
Brisbane Lions
Lions